The Lapidary Journal Jewelry Artist is an American magazine dedicated to lapidary interests such as gemology, jewelry design, metalworking, mineralogy, rocks, and gemstones.

The magazine was established in 1947 as the Lapidary Journal, and was renamed to its current title in 2005.

The headquarters of the magazine is in Devon, Pennsylvania.

It is published by Interweave Press, a subsidiary of F+W Media, Inc.

References

External links 
 

Visual arts magazines published in the United States
American jewelry designers
Arts and crafts magazines
English-language magazines
Gemology
Magazines established in 1947
Magazines published in Pennsylvania
Mineralogy